The St. Louis Port Authority is responsible for managing the facilities that make St. Louis, Missouri, the United States second-busiest inland port.
St. Louis is the northernmost port on the Mississippi River that is free of canal locks and is ice-free year-round. Twenty-nine industrial centers with a population of 90 million can be reached from St. Louis by barge.

References

Organizations based in St. Louis
Government of St. Louis